Jean Carper (born 1932) is a New York Times best-selling author, an American medical journalist, contributing editor to USA Weekend, and author of 24 books.

Early life and education 
Jean Elinor Carper was born January 3, 1932, the daughter of Jethro and Natella Marie (Boyer) Carper, in Delaware, Ohio. She is a 1953 graduate of Ohio Wesleyan University in Delaware, Ohio, where she majored in speech and was a member of the debate team that won a state championship.

Career 
Carper was CNN's first medical correspondent when the network began in 1980. She has also appeared on the Today Show, Good Morning America and Dateline. For 14 years she wrote a weekly column called "EatSmart" for Gannett’s Sunday supplement, USA Weekend. She has written for The Huffington Post about Alzheimer's disease, and produced an independent documentary on the disease, Monster in the Mind, in 2016.

Three of Carper's books have been on the New York Times best-seller list: Food: Your Miracle Medicine, in 1993; Stop Aging Now!, in 1995; and Miracle Cures: Dramatic New Scientific Discoveries Revealing the Healing Powers of Herbs, Vitamins, and Other Natural Remedies, in 1997. After the release of Stop Aging Now, her readers urged her to formulate an all-in-one multivitamin based on her research. By popular demand, she produced a multi vitamin anti-aging formula in 1996, called Stop Aging Now! She sold the company in 2007 and is on the company's scientific advisory board.

Her success as a medical journalist has been credited to her ability to accurately translate research in ways understandable to the average person. Her books on health have been translated into 20 foreign languages and are still sold and read throughout the world.

Selected publications 
Carper is the author of 24 books, mostly on nutrition, health, and natural remedies, including two cookbooks.
 Stay Alive! (1965)
 Bitter Greetings (1967)
 The Dark Side of the Marketplace, co-authored with Senator Warren Magnuson (1968) 
 Eating May Be Hazardous to Your Health (1972) 
 The Food Pharmacy (1989)
 Stop Aging Now! (1996)
 Miracle Cures (1998)
 Food: Your Miracle Medicine (1994)
 Your Miracle Brain (2002)
 Eatsmart: The Nutrition Cookbook You Can't Live Without (2004)
 Jean Carper's Complete Healthy Cookbook (2007)
 100 Simple Things You Can Do to Prevent Alzheimer's (2010)

Awards 
Carper won the 1995 Excellence in Journalism Award from the American Aging Association.

Ohio Wesleyan University awarded her a Distinguished Achievement Citation in 1999, recognizing her work as a "major force in enlightening the public about the latest scientific discoveries involving diet, food, and vitamins as causes and cures of our modern epidemic of chronic diseases, including heart disease and cancer."

In 2014 she was inducted into The Ohio Foundation of Independent Colleges Hall of Excellence.

References

External links

Jean Carper on NBC 4 - 100 Simple Things You Can Do to Prevent Alzheimer's (video, 5:39)

1932 births
Living people
American columnists
American medical writers
Women medical writers
American television journalists
American medical journalists
Ohio Wesleyan University alumni
Biogerontologists
American women non-fiction writers
American women columnists
21st-century American women